Abner P. Allen (October 9, 1839 – August 22, 1905) was an American soldier who received the Medal of Honor for valor during the American Civil War.

Biography
Allen was born in Woodford County, Illinois. He joined the 39th Illinois infantry Regiment from Bloomington, Illinois, in January 1864, and mustered out with his regiment on December 6, 1865.

By the time the 39th was involved in the Siege of Petersburg, Virginia, Allen was a corporal in Company K. When the regiment (as part of the XXIV Corps under Major General John Gibbon) was assaulting Fort Gregg on April 2, 1865, under heavy fire, he was at the front as a color bearer.

At the surrender ceremony at Appomattox Courthouse a week later, Allen was given the honor of carrying Illinois' flag. He later traveled to Washington, D.C. with General Gibbon and 76 captured Confederate colors. He received his medal there from Secretary of War Edwin Stanton.

Allen died in 1905 and is buried in Centerburg Cemetery, Centerburg, Ohio.

Medal of Honor citation
Rank and organization: Corporal, Company K, 39th Illinois Infantry. Place and date: At Petersburg, Virginia, April 2, 1865. Entered service at: Bloomington, Ill. Birth: Woodford County, Ill. Date of issue: May 12, 1865.

Citation:

Gallantry as color bearer in the assault on Fort Gregg.

See also

List of American Civil War Medal of Honor recipients: A–F

References

External links

1839 births
1905 deaths
Union Army soldiers
United States Army Medal of Honor recipients
People of Illinois in the American Civil War
People from Woodford County, Illinois
American Civil War recipients of the Medal of Honor